Gümüşova District is a district of the Düzce Province of Turkey. Its seat is the town of Gümüşova. Its area is 103 km2, and its population is 16,844 (2022).

Composition
There is one municipality in Gümüşova District:
 Gümüşova

There are 21 villages in Gümüşova District:

 Adaköy
 Ardıçdibi
 Çaybükü
 Dededüzü
 Dereköy
 Elmacık
 Hacıkadirler
 Halilbey
 Kahveleryanı
 Kıyıköy
 Pazarcık
 Selamlar
 Soğuksu
 Sultaniye
 Yakabaşı
 Yeşilyayla
 Yıldıztepe
 Yongalık

References

Districts of Düzce Province